João Neves may refer to:
 João Neves (judoka)
 João Neves (footballer)

See also
 João Neves da Fontoura, Brazilian lawyer, diplomat and politician